Science Friction is a studio album by saxophonist Tim Berne which was recorded in 2001 and released on Berne's Screwgun label.

Reception

The AllMusic review awarded the album 4 stars stating "in the case of Science Friction, the result is yet another peak in his recording career -- although when one considers Berne's other releases of the early '00s, the peak looks more like a plateau". The All About Jazz review said that "Compared to Berne's earlier efforts, Science Friction represents a high-water mark. Berne remains one of the most distinctive voices in modern jazz, who—best of all—seems to have an uncanny ability to assemble sympathetic musical collaborators who share his vision".

Track listing
All compositions by Tim Berne except as indicated
 "Huevos" - 6:27   
 "iHornet" - 3:27   
 "Sigh Fry" (Berne, Marc Ducret) - 9:50   
 "Manatee Woman" - 12:20   
 "Mikromaus" - 2:03   
 "Jalapeño Diplomacy" - 5:20   
 "The Mallomar Maneuvre" (Berne, David Torn) 1:04   
 "Clown Finger" - 11:31

Personnel
Tim Berne - alto saxophone
Marc Ducret - acoustic and electric guitar
Craig Taborn - electronic keyboards
Tom Rainey - drums

References 

2002 albums
Tim Berne albums
Screwgun Records albums
Albums produced by David Torn